In quantum computing and specifically the quantum circuit model of computation, a quantum logic gate (or simply quantum gate) is a basic quantum circuit operating on a small number of qubits. They are the building blocks of quantum circuits, like classical logic gates are for conventional digital circuits.

Unlike many classical logic gates, quantum logic gates are reversible. It is possible to perform classical computing using only reversible gates. For example, the reversible Toffoli gate can implement all Boolean functions, often at the cost of having to use ancilla bits. The Toffoli gate has a direct quantum equivalent, showing that quantum circuits can perform all operations performed by classical circuits.

Quantum gates are unitary operators, and are described as unitary matrices relative to some basis. Usually we use the computational basis, which unless we compare it with something, just means that for a d-level quantum system (such as a qubit, a quantum register, or qutrits and qudits) we have labeled the orthogonal basis vectors  or use binary notation.

History 
 The current notation for quantum gates was developed by many of the founders of quantum information science including Adriano Barenco, Charles Bennett, Richard Cleve, David P. DiVincenzo, Norman Margolus, Peter Shor, Tycho Sleator, John A. Smolin, and Harald Weinfurter, building on notation introduced by Richard Feynman in 1986.

Representation 

Quantum logic gates are represented by unitary matrices. A gate which acts on  qubits is represented by a  unitary matrix, and the set of all such gates with the group operation of matrix multiplication is the symmetry group U(2n). The quantum states that the gates act upon are unit vectors in  complex dimensions, with the complex Euclidean norm (the 2-norm). The basis vectors (sometimes called eigenstates) are the possible outcomes if measured, and a quantum state is a linear combination of these outcomes. The most common quantum gates operate on vector spaces of one or two qubits, just like the common classical logic gates operate on one or two bits.

Even though the quantum logic gates belong to continuous symmetry groups, real hardware is inexact and thus limited in precision. The application of gates typically introduces errors, and the quantum states fidelities decreases over time. If error correction is used, the usable gates are further restricted to a finite set. Later in this article, this is sometimes ignored as the focus is on the ideal quantum gates' properties.

Quantum states are typically represented by "kets", from a notation known as bra-ket.

The vector representation of a single qubit is

These values determine the probability of measuring a 0 or a 1, when measuring the state of the qubit. See measurement below for details.

The value zero is represented by the ket  and the value one is represented by the ket 

The tensor product (or Kronecker product) is used to combine quantum states. The combined state for a qubit register is the tensor product of the constituent qubits. The tensor product is denoted by the symbol 

The vector representation of two qubits is:

The action of the gate on a specific quantum state is found by multiplying the vector  which represents the state by the matrix  representing the gate. The result is a new quantum state

Notable examples 

There exists an uncountably infinite number of gates. Some of them have been named by various authors, and below follow some of those most often used in the literature.

Identity gate 
The identity gate is the identity matrix, usually written as I,  and is defined for a single qubit as

where I is basis independent and does not modify the quantum state. The identity gate is most useful when describing mathematically the result of various gate operations or when discussing multi-qubit circuits.

Pauli gates (X,Y,Z) 

The Pauli gates  are the three Pauli matrices  and act on a single qubit. The Pauli X, Y and Z equate, respectively, to a rotation around the x, y and z axes of the Bloch sphere by  radians.

The Pauli-X gate is the quantum equivalent of the NOT gate for classical computers with respect to the standard basis  which distinguishes the z axis on the Bloch sphere. Pauli Z leaves the basis state  unchanged and maps  to  Due to this nature, Pauli Z is sometimes called phase-flip.

These matrices are usually represented as

The Pauli matrices are involutory, meaning that the square of a Pauli matrix is the identity matrix.

The Pauli matrices also anti-commute, for example 

The matrix exponential of a Pauli matrix  is a rotation operator, often written as

Controlled gates 

Controlled gates act on 2 or more qubits, where one or more qubits act as a control for some operation. With respect to the basis     it is represented by the Hermitian unitary matrix:

The CNOT (or controlled Pauli-X) gate can be described as the gate that maps the basis states , where  is XOR.

The CNOT can be expressed in the Pauli basis as:

More generally if U is a gate that operates on a single qubit with matrix representation

then the controlled-U gate is a gate that operates on two qubits in such a way that the first qubit serves as a control. It maps the basis states as follows.

The matrix representing the controlled U is

When U is one of the Pauli operators, X,Y, Z, the respective terms "controlled-X", "controlled-Y", or "controlled-Z" are sometimes used. Sometimes this is shortened to just CX, CY and CZ.

Control can be extended to gates with arbitrary number of qubits and functions in programming languages. Functions can be conditioned on superposition states.

Classical control 

 Gates can also be controlled by classical logic. A quantum computer is controlled by a classical computer, and behave like a coprocessor that receives instructions from the classical computer about what gates to execute on which qubits. Classical control is simply the inclusion, or omission, of gates in the instruction sequence for the quantum computer.

Phase shift gates 
This is equivalent to tracing a horizontal circle (a line of latitude), or a rotation along the z-axis on the Bloch sphere by  radians. The phase shift gate is represented by the matrix:

where  is the phase shift with the period . Some common examples are the T gate where  (historically known as the  gate), the phase gate (also known as the S gate, written as S, though S is sometimes used for SWAP gates) where  and the Pauli-Z gate where .

The phase shift gates are related to each other as follows:

Note that the phase gate  is not Hermitian (except for all ). These gates are different from their Hermitian conjugates: .

Hadamard gate 
The Hadamard or Walsh-Hadamard gate, named after Jacques Hadamard and Joseph L. Walsh,  acts on a single qubit. The Hadamard gate performs a rotation of  about the axis  at the Bloch sphere, and is therefore involutory. It is represented by the Hadamard matrix: 

For example,  and

Swap gate 

The swap gate swaps two qubits.

The swap gate can be decomposed into summation form:

Toffoli (CCNOT) gate 

The Toffoli gate, named after Tommaso Toffoli and also called the CCNOT gate or Deutsch gate , is a 3-bit gate which is universal for classical computation but not for quantum computation. The quantum Toffoli gate is the same gate, defined for 3 qubits. It is an example of a CC-U (controlled-controlled Unitary) gate. Since it is the quantum analog of a classical gate, it is completely specified by its truth table. The Toffoli gate is universal when combined with the single qubit Hadamard gate.

The Toffoli gate is related to the classical AND and XOR operations as it performs the mapping  on states in the computational basis.

The Toffoli gate can be expressed using Pauli matrices as

Universal quantum gates 

A set of universal quantum gates is any set of gates to which any operation possible on a quantum computer can be reduced, that is, any other unitary operation can be expressed as a finite sequence of gates from the set. Technically, this is impossible with anything less than an uncountable set of gates since the number of possible quantum gates is uncountable, whereas the number of finite sequences from a finite set is countable. To solve this problem, we only require that any quantum operation can be approximated by a sequence of gates from this finite set. Moreover, for unitaries on a constant number of qubits, the Solovay–Kitaev theorem guarantees that this can be done efficiently.

Some universal quantum gate sets include:

 The Clifford set {CNOT, H, S} + T gate. The Clifford set alone is not a universal quantum gate set, as it can be efficiently simulated classically according to the Gottesman–Knill theorem.
 The Toffoli gate + Hadamard gate. The Toffoli gate alone forms a set of universal gates for reversible boolean algebraic logic circuits which encompasses all classical computation.

Deutsch gate 
A single-gate set of universal quantum gates can also be formulated using the parametrized three-qubit Deutsch gate , named after physicist David Deutsch. It is a general case of CC-U or controlled-controlled-Unitary gate, and is defined as

Unfortunately, a working Deutsch gate has remained out of reach, due to lack of a protocol. There are some proposals to realize a Deutsch gate with dipole-dipole interaction in neutral atoms.

A universal logic gate for reversible classical computing, the Toffoli gate, is reducible to the Deutsch gate, thus showing that all reversible classical logic operations can be performed on a universal quantum computer.

There also exist single two-qubit gates sufficient for universality. In 1996, Adriano Barenco showed that the Deutsch gate can be decomposed using only a single two-qubit gate (Barenco gate), but it is hard to realize experimentally.  This feature is exclusive to quantum circuits, as there is no  classical two bit gate that is both reversible and universal. Universal two-qubit  gates could be implemented to improve classical reversible circuits in fast low power microprocessors.

Circuit composition

Serially wired gates 
Assume that we have two gates A and B, that both act on  qubits. When B is put after A in a series circuit, then the effect of the two gates can be described as a single gate C.

 

Where  is matrix multiplication. The resulting gate C will have the same dimensions as A and B. The order in which the gates would appear in a circuit diagram is reversed when multiplying them together.

For example, putting the Pauli X gate after the Pauli Y gate, both of which act on a single qubit, can be described as a single combined gate C:

 

The product symbol is often omitted.

Exponents of quantum gates 
All real exponents of unitary matrices are also unitary matrices, and all quantum gates are unitary matrices.

Positive integer exponents are equivalent to sequences of serially wired gates (e.g.  and the real exponents is a generalization of the series circuit.

 for any unitary matrix . The identity matrix behaves like a NOP and can be represented as bare wire in quantum circuits, or not shown at all.

All gates are unitary matrices, so that  and  where  is the conjugate transpose.

Note that for a Hermitian matrix  and because of unitarity,  so  for all Hermitian gates. They are involutory. Examples of Hermitian gates are the Pauli gates, Hadamard, CNOT, SWAP and Toffoli. Hermitian unitary matrices  has the property  where

Parallel gates 
The tensor product (or Kronecker product) of two quantum gates is the gate that is equal to the two gates in parallel.

If we, as in the picture, combine the Pauli-Y gate with the Pauli-X gate in parallel, then this can be written as:

 

Both the Pauli-X and the Pauli-Y gate act on a single qubit. The resulting gate  act on two qubits.

Sometimes the tensor product symbol is omitted, and indexes are used for the operators instead.

Hadamard transform 

The gate  is the Hadamard gate  applied in parallel on 2 qubits. It can be written as:

This "two-qubit parallel Hadamard gate" will when applied to, for example, the two-qubit zero-vector  create a quantum state that have equal probability of being observed in any of its four possible outcomes;    and  We can write this operation as:

The probability to observe any state is the square of the absolute value of the measurable states amplitude, which in the above example means that there is one in four that we observe any one of the individual four cases. See measurement for details.

 performs the Hadamard transform on two qubits. Similarly the gate  performs a Hadamard transform on a register of  qubits.

When applied to a register of  qubits all initialized to  the Hadamard transform puts the quantum register into a superposition with equal probability of being measured in any of its  possible states:

This state is a uniform superposition and it is generated as the first step in some search algorithms, for example in amplitude amplification and phase estimation.

If not measured, it is a quantum state with equal probability amplitude  for each of its possible states.

The Hadamard transform acts on a register  with  qubits such that  as follows:

Application on entangled states 
If two or more qubits are viewed as a single quantum state, this combined state is equal to the tensor product of the constituent qubits. Any state that can be written as a tensor product from the constituent subsystems are called separable states. On the other hand, an entangled state is any state that cannot be tensor-factorized, or in other words: An entangled state can not be written as a tensor product of its constituent qubits states. Special care must be taken when applying gates to constituent qubits that make up entangled states.

If we have a set of N qubits that are entangled and wish to apply a quantum gate on M < N qubits in the set, we will have to extend the gate to take N qubits. This application can be done by combining the gate with an identity matrix such that their tensor product becomes a gate that act on N qubits. The identity matrix  is a representation of the gate that maps every state to itself (i.e., does nothing at all). In a circuit diagram the identity gate or matrix will often appear as just a bare wire.

For example, the Hadamard gate  acts on a single qubit, but if we feed it the first of the two qubits that constitute the entangled Bell state  we cannot write that operation easily. We need to extend the Hadamard gate  with the identity gate  so that we can act on quantum states that span two qubits:

The gate  can now be applied to any two-qubit state, entangled or otherwise. The gate  will leave the second qubit untouched and apply the Hadamard transform to the first qubit. If applied to the Bell state in our example, we may write that as:

Computational complexity and the tensor product 
The time complexity for multiplying two -matrices is at least  if using a classical machine. Because the size of a gate that operates on  qubits is  it means that the time for simulating a step in a quantum circuit (by means of multiplying the gates) that operates on generic entangled states is  For this reason it is believed to be intractable to simulate large entangled quantum systems using classical computers. Subsets of the gates, such as the Clifford gates, or the trivial case of circuits that only implement classical boolean functions (e.g. combinations of X, CNOT, Toffoli), can however be efficiently simulated on classical computers.

The state vector of a quantum register with  qubits is  complex entries. Storing the probability amplitudes as a list of floating point values is not tractable for large .

Unitary inversion of gates 
Because all quantum logical gates are reversible, any composition of multiple gates is also reversible. All products and tensor products (i.e. series and parallel combinations) of unitary matrices are also unitary matrices. This means that it is possible to construct an inverse of all algorithms and functions, as long as they contain only gates.

Initialization, measurement, I/O and spontaneous decoherence are side effects in quantum computers. Gates however are purely functional and bijective.

If  is a unitary matrix, then  and  The dagger denotes the conjugate transpose. It is also called the Hermitian adjoint.

If a function  is a product of  gates,  the unitary inverse of the function  can be constructed:

Because  we have, after repeated application on itself

Gates that are their own unitary inverses are called Hermitian or self-adjoint operators. Some elementary gates such as the Hadamard (H) and the Pauli gates (I, X, Y, Z) are Hermitian operators, while others like the phase shift (S, T, P, CPhase) gates generally are not.

For example, an algorithm for addition can be used for subtraction, if it is being "run in reverse", as its unitary inverse. The inverse quantum fourier transform is the unitary inverse. Unitary inverses can also be used for uncomputation. Programming languages for quantum computers, such as Microsoft's Q#, Bernhard Ömer's QCL, and IBM's Qiskit, contain function inversion as programming concepts.

Measurement 

Measurement (sometimes called observation) is irreversible and therefore not a quantum gate, because it assigns the observed quantum state to a single value. Measurement takes a quantum state and projects it to one of the basis vectors, with a likelihood equal to the square of the vector's length (in the 2-norm) along that basis vector. This is known as the Born rule and appears as a stochastic non-reversible operation as it probabilistically sets the quantum state equal to the basis vector that represents the measured state. At the instant of measurement, the state is said to "collapse" to the definite single value that was measured. Why and how, or even if the quantum state collapses at measurement, is called the measurement problem.

The probability of measuring a value with probability amplitude  is  where  is the modulus.

For example, measuring a qubit with the quantum state  will yield with equal probability either  or 

A quantum state  that spans  qubits can be written as a vector in  complex dimensions:  This is because the tensor product of  qubits is a vector in  dimensions. This way, a register of  qubits can be measured to  distinct states, similar to how a register of  classical bits can hold  distinct states. Unlike with the bits of classical computers, quantum states can have non-zero probability amplitudes in multiple measurable values simultaneously. This is called superposition.

The rotations that the gates perform is in the symmetry group U(2n). Measurement is then a probabilistic projection of the points at the surface of this complex sphere onto the basis vectors that span the space (and labels the outcomes).

In many cases the space is represented as a Hilbert space  rather than some specific  complex space. The number of dimensions (defined by the basis vectors, and thus also the possible outcomes from measurement) is then often implied by the operands, for example as the required state space for solving a problem. In Grover's algorithm, Lov named this generic basis vector set "the database".

The selection of basis vectors against to measure a quantum state will influence the outcome of the measurement. See change of basis and Von Neumann entropy for details. In this article, we always use the computational basis, which means that we have labeled the  basis vectors of an -qubit register  or use the binary representation 

In quantum mechanics, the basis vectors constitute an orthonormal basis.

An example of usage of an alternative measurement basis is in the BB84 cipher.

The effect of measurement on entangled states 

If two quantum states (i.e. qubits, or registers) are entangled (meaning that their combined state cannot be expressed as a tensor product), measurement of one register affects or reveals the state of the other register by partially or entirely collapsing its state too. This effect can be used for computation, and is used in many algorithms.

The Hadamard-CNOT combination acts on the zero-state as follows: 

This resulting state is the Bell state  It cannot be described as a tensor product of two qubits. There is no solution for

The quantum state spans the two qubits. This is called entanglement. Measuring one of the two qubits that make up this Bell state will result in that the other qubit logically must have the same value, both must be the same: Either it will be found in the state  or in the state  If we measure one of the qubits to be for example  then the other qubit must also be  because their combined state became  Measurement of one of the qubits collapses the entire quantum state, that span the two qubits.

The GHZ state is a similar entangled quantum state that spans three or more qubits.

This type of value-assignment occurs instantaneously over any distance and this has as of 2018 been experimentally verified by QUESS for distances of up to 1200 kilometers. That the phenomena appears to happen instantaneously as opposed to the time it would take to traverse the distance separating the qubits at the speed of light is called the EPR paradox, and it is an open question in physics how to resolve this. Originally it was solved by giving up the assumption of local realism, but other interpretations have also emerged. For more information see the Bell test experiments. The no-communication theorem proves that this phenomenon cannot be used for faster-than-light communication of classical information.

Measurement on registers with pairwise entangled qubits 

Because of how unitary inverses of gates act,  For example, say , then 

The equality will hold no matter in which order measurement is performed (on the registers A or B), assuming that  has run to completion. Measurement can even be randomly and concurrently interleaved qubit by qubit, since the measurements assignment of one qubit will limit the possible value-space from the other entangled qubits.

Even though the equalities holds, the probabilities for measuring the possible outcomes may change as a result of applying , as may be the intent in a quantum search algorithm.

This effect of value-sharing via entanglement is used in Shor's algorithm, phase estimation and in quantum counting. Using the Fourier transform to amplify the probability amplitudes of the solution states for some problem is a generic method known as "Fourier fishing".

Logic function synthesis 
Functions and routines that only use gates can themselves be described as matrices, just like the smaller gates. The matrix that represents a quantum function acting on  qubits has size  For example, a function that acts on a "qubyte" (a register of 8 qubits) would be represented by a matrix with  elements.

Unitary transformations that are not in the set of gates natively available at the quantum computer (the primitive gates) can be synthesised, or approximated, by combining the available primitive gates in a circuit. One way to do this is to factor the matrix that encodes the unitary transformation into a product of tensor products (i.e. series and parallel circuits) of the available primitive gates. The group U(2q) is the symmetry group for the gates that act on  qubits. Factorization is then the problem of finding a path in U(2q) from the generating set of primitive gates. The Solovay–Kitaev theorem shows that given a sufficient set of primitive gates, there exist an efficient approximate for any gate. For the general case with a large number of qubits this direct approach to circuit synthesis is intractable.

Because the gates unitary nature, all functions must be reversible and always be bijective mappings of input to output. There must always exist a function  such that  Functions that are not invertible can be made invertible by adding ancilla qubits to the input or the output, or both. After the function has run to completion, the ancilla qubits can then either be uncomputed or left untouched. Measuring or otherwise collapsing the quantum state of an ancilla qubit (e.g. by re-initializing the value of it, or by its spontaneous decoherence) that have not been uncomputed may result in errors, as their state may be entangled with the qubits that are still being used in computations.

All Boolean algebraic expressions can be encoded as unitary transforms (quantum logic gates), for example by using combinations of the Pauli-X, CNOT and Toffoli gates. These gates are functionally complete in the Boolean logic domain.

There are many unitary transforms available in the libraries of Q#, QCL, Qiskit, and other quantum programming languages. It also appears in the literature.

For example, where  is the number of qubits that constitutes the register  is implemented as the following in QCL:
cond qufunct inc(qureg x) { // increment register
  int i;
  for i = #x-1 to 0 step -1 {
    CNot(x[i], x[0::i]);     // apply controlled-not from
  }                          // MSB to LSB
}

In QCL, decrement is done by "undoing" increment. The prefix ! is used to instead run the unitary inverse of the function. !inc(x) is the inverse of inc(x) and instead performs the operation  The cond keyword means that the function can be conditional.

In the model of computation used in this article (the quantum circuit model), a classic computer generates the gate composition for the quantum computer, and the quantum computer behaves as a coprocessor that receives instructions from the classical computer about which primitive gates to apply to which qubits. Measurement of quantum registers results in binary values that the classical computer can use in its computations. Quantum algorithms often contain both a classical and a quantum part. Unmeasured I/O (sending qubits to remote computers without collapsing their quantum states) can be used to create networks of quantum computers. Entanglement swapping can then be used to realize distributed algorithms with quantum computers that are not directly connected. Examples of distributed algorithms that only require the use of a handful of quantum logic gates is superdense coding, the quantum Byzantine agreement and the BB84 cipherkey exchange protocol.

See also 

 Adiabatic quantum computation
 Cellular automaton
 Cloud-based quantum computing
 Counterfactual definiteness
 Counterfactual quantum computation
 Landauer's principle
 Logical connective
 One-way quantum computer
 Quantum algorithm
 Quantum cellular automaton
 Quantum channel
 Quantum finite automata
 Quantum logic
 Quantum memory
 Quantum network
 Quantum Zeno effect
 Reversible computation
 Unitary transformation (quantum mechanics)

Notes

References

Sources 

 
 
 

 
Quantum information science
Logic gates
Australian inventions